Brian P. Roman is an American astronomer.

He has co-discovered the periodic comets 111P/Helin–Roman–Crockett, 117P/Helin–Roman–Alu and 132P/Helin–Roman–Alu. Brian Roman is also credited by the Minor Planet Center with the discovery of 11 minor planet between 1988 and 1990, including 4954 Eric, a near-Earth asteroid of the Apollo group. All of his discoveries were made at Palomar Observatory, where he also participated in the Planet-Crossing Asteroid Survey.

The main-belt asteroid 4575 Broman, discovered by American astronomer Eleanor Helin in 1987, was named in his honour.

References

External links 
 Brian Roman, McDonald Observatory

American astronomers
Discoverers of asteroids
Discoveries by Brian P. Roman
Living people
Year of birth missing (living people)